Wolfsberger AC, commonly referred to as Wolfsberg or simply WAC, is an Austrian association football club from Wolfsberg, Carinthia, who currently play in the Austrian Bundesliga. Between the 2007–08 and 2011–12 seasons, Wolfsberger AC entered a cooperation with SK St. Andrä, competing under the name WAC/St. Andrä during that period. The team is currently called RZ Pellets WAC for sponsorship reasons.

After having played the majority of its existence in the lower leagues, Wolfsberger AC finished their 2011–12 season as champions of the 2011–12 Austrian Football First League (now known as the "Second League", or "2. Liga") and earned promotion to the Austrian Bundesliga for the first time in the club's history, in which they finished fifth at the end of the 2012–13 Austrian Football Bundesliga.

Wolfsberg finished third in the 2018–19 Austrian Football Bundesliga which qualified them for the 2019–20 UEFA Europa League group stage. They finished in fourth place in Group J of the UEFA Europa League in the 2019–20 season.

History
Wolfsberger AC was founded by Adolf Ptazcowsky, Karl Weber, Hermann Maierhofer, Franz Hafner and Michael Schlacher in 1931. After spending the first thirty-seven years of its existence on lower tiers of the Austrian league pyramid, the club eventually achieved promotion to the Austrian Regional League, which was on the second tier of the pyramid at that time, in 1968. WAC stayed at this level, with one exception during the 1977–78 season, for the next seventeen years, establishing themselves as a mid-table side.

At the end of the 1984–85 season, Wolfsberger AC eventually dropped back to the third level. The club returned for two further second-level appearances during the 1988–89 and 1990–91 seasons, but was immediately relegated each time. In 1994, the club was a founding member of the reactivated Regional League as the third tier of the pyramid. After being in the promotion race for the first few years in the new league, strength of the club gradually declined and eventually led to relegation at the end of the 2001–02 season.

In 2007, WAC and neighbours SK St. Andrä decided to enter a cooperation. While both clubs remained as separate entities, they closely worked together on almost all aspects: "Central areas of both clubs like administration, management, economy, marketing, gastronomy, as well as the athletic section as the core (both the senior and junior teams) will be centrally administered from the newly created offices of WAC/St. Andrä at Wolfsberg." Since SK St. Andrä were playing at the Regional League, the team began at this level, from which it was promoted to the First League in 2010. At the end of the 2011–12 season, the cooperation secured promotion to the Bundesliga with one round of matches to go. Soon afterwards, the cooperation was dissolved; Wolfsberger AC thus competed as an independent club on the highest level of Austrian football for the first time in their history.

After their first year in the highest class they came in 5th. After the season manager Nenad Bjelica left the club and became manager of FK Austria Wien, the champion of the 2012–13 season. Slobodan Grubor replaced him but after weak performances in the new season he was replaced by Dietmar Kühbauer.

The team became known as 'RZ Pellets WAC' from the 2014–15 season, due to sponsorship.

Wolfsberger AC qualified to the 2019–20 UEFA Europa League group stage for first time in their history, after finishing third in the 2018–19 Austrian Football Bundesliga. They were knocked in the last 16 after losing 8-1 on aggregate to Premier League side Tottenham Hotspur.

Honours

Domestic

League
2. Liga:
Winners (1): 2011–12

European record

Current squad

Out on loan

Club Officials

Managers
 Helmut Kirisits (7 April 1989 – 4 Nov 1990, 7 June 1991 – 30 June 1991, 13 Oct 1992 – 17 Oct 1995)
 Hans-Peter Buchleitner (1 July 1995 – 30 June 1997)
 Peter Hrstic (1 July 2007 – 26 Oct 2008)
 Hans-Peter Buchleitner (27 Oct 2008 – 9 May 2010)
 Nenad Bjelica (10 May 2010 – 17 June 2013)
 Slobodan Grubor (17 June 2013 – 1 Sept 2013)
 Dietmar Kühbauer (2 Sept 2013 – 25 Nov 2015)
 Heimo Pfeifenberger (25 Nov 2015 – 17 March 2018)
 Robert Ibertsberger (caretaker) (18 March 2018 – 31 May 2018)
 Christian Ilzer (1 June 2018 – 30 June 2019)
 Gerhard Struber (1 July 2019 – 19 Nov 2019)
 Mohamed Sahli (caretaker) (20 Nov 2019 – 31 December 2019)
 Ferdinand Feldhofer (1 January 2020 – present)

References

External links

Official website 
Soccerway profile

 
Association football clubs established in 1931
Football clubs in Austria
1931 establishments in Austria